Anobit Technologies, Ltd. was an Israeli fabless designer of flash memory controllers. They were acquired by Apple in 2012 as they were the maker of a flash-memory drive component for the iPhone.

Background
The firm was founded in 2006 by Prof. Ehud Weinstein, Ariel Maislos, and Dr. Ofir Shalvi. It holds 65 patents (24 granted and 41 pending), including Memory Signal Processing technology. It was headquartered in Herzliya, with an American office in Marlborough, Massachusetts. Investors in the company included Boston-based Battery Ventures (Scott Tobin).

Acquisition
Anobit was acquired on January 6, 2012 by Apple Inc. for a reported $390 million.

See also

 Science and technology in Israel
 Economy of Israel
 List of companies of Israel
 List of mergers and acquisitions by Apple

References

Computer companies established in 2006
2006 establishments in Israel
Privately held companies of Israel
Computer memory companies
Fabless semiconductor companies
Apple Inc. acquisitions
Mergers and acquisitions of Israeli companies
Apple Inc. subsidiaries
2012 mergers and acquisitions